Anna Machin is an evolutionary anthropologist at the Department of Experimental Psychology at Oxford University, England. She is the author of a book on fatherhood, The Life of Dad: The Making of a Modern Father.

Education and career
Machin graduated with a B.A. degree in anthropology and English, followed in 1999 by a M.Sc. degree in human evolution and behaviour from University College, London. In 2006 she obtained her PhD in archeology from the University of Reading. She was a postdoctoral fellow working with Robin Dunbar at Oxford University from 2008 to 2014 after which she became a visiting academic while also pursuing a career as a freelance scientific writer and broadcaster.

Scientific research

Archeology
In archeology, Machin has studied and commented on the symmetry, morphology, effectiveness and sex appeal of Acheulean handaxes.

Attachment and love
Machin has done research on attachment and love between parents and children, between loving couples and between best friends.

Fatherhood
As an evolutionary anthropologist, Machin believes that both mothers and fathers have been primed by evolution to parent their children. She has studied father-child relationships and takes the position that human fatherhood would not have developed unless the investment that fathers make in their children is vital for the survival of the species. She has concluded that fatherhood was fundamental to the development of humans and humanity, with fathers performing critical parenting tasks in coaching and educating their children.

Machin has also studied the expectations and reality of fatherhood, and systemic impediments to fathers' involvement in their children's lives.

Popular media
Machin has been interviewed and cited about fatherhood and love relationships by a variety of popular media outlets, including 
the New Scientist, 
The Guardian, 
BBC, 
The Daily Telegraph, 
The Mirror, 
Eltern, and
Broadly.

Selected publications

Books
 Anna Machin, The Life of Dad: The Making of a Modern Father, Simon & Schuster, 2018.

Scientific articles
 Machin AJ, Hosfield R, Mithen SJ. Testing the functional utility of handaxe symmetry: fallow deer butchery with replica handaxes. Lithics: The Journal of the Lithic Studies Society, 2005, 26:23-37.
 Machin AJ, Hosfield RT, Mithen SJ. Why are some handaxes symmetrical? Testing the influence of handaxe morphology on butchery effectiveness. Journal of Archaeological Science. 2007 Jun 1;34(6):883-93.
 Machin AJ. Why handaxes just aren't that sexy: a response to Kohn & Mithen (1999). Antiquity. 2008 Sep;82(317):761-6.
 Machin A. The role of the individual agent in Acheulean biface variability: a multi-factorial model. Journal of Social Archaeology. 2009 Feb;9(1):35-58.
 Machin AJ, Dunbar RI. The brain opioid theory of social attachment: a review of the evidence. Behaviour. 2011 Jan 1;148(9-10):985-1025.
 Machin A, Dunbar R. Sex and gender as factors in romantic partnerships and best friendships. Journal of Relationships Research. 2013 Oct;4.
 Machin AJ. Mind the Gap: The Expectation and Reality of Involved Fatherhood. Fathering: A Journal of Theory, Research & Practice about Men as Fathers. 2015 Apr 1;13(1).
 Pearce E, Launay J, Machin A, Dunbar RI. Is group singing special? health, well‐being and social bonds in community‐based adult education classes. Journal of community & applied social psychology. 2016 Nov;26(6):518-33.
 Machin A, Dunbar R. Is Kinship a Schema? Moral Decisions and the Function of the Human Kin Naming System. Adaptive Human Behavior and Physiology. 2016 Sep 1;2(3):195-219.

Popular media
 Anna Machin, Ask a grown-up: why do humans kiss?, The Guardian, July 26, 2014.
 Anna Machin, I studied fatherhood and here are five things I want dads to know, iNews, July 2, 2018.
 Anna Machin, Top Tips for Dads on How Best to Bond with Baby, My Baba, November 7, 2018. 
 Anna Machin, The marvel of the human dad, Aeon, January 19, 2019.

References

English anthropologists
British women anthropologists
English archaeologists
Fatherhood
Alumni of the University of Reading
Academics of the University of Oxford
Living people
Year of birth missing (living people)
British women archaeologists